Below is a list of FTP commands that may be sent to an FTP server, including all commands that are standardized in RFC 959 by the IETF. All commands below are RFC 959 based unless stated otherwise. Note that most command-line FTP clients present their own set of commands to users. For example, GET is the common user command to download a file instead of the raw command RETR.

See also
 List of FTP server return codes - in response to commands from a client, the FTP server returns reply codes

External links
   - CWD Command of FTP
   - File Transfer Protocol (FTP)
  - FTP Operation Over Big Address Records (FOOBAR) 
  - FTP Security Extensions
  - Feature negotiation mechanism for the File Transfer Protocol
  - FTP Extensions for IPv6 and NATs
  - Internationalization of the File Transfer Protocol
  - Extensions to FTP
  - FTP Command and Extension Registry
  - File Transfer Protocol HOST Command for Virtual Hosts
 The 'MFMT', 'MFCT', and 'MFF' Command Extensions for FTP
 Streamlined FTP Command Extensions ('CSID', 'AVBL', 'DSIZ', 'RMDA', and 'THMB' commands)
 FTP Extension Allowing IP Forwarding (NATs)
 UTF-8 Option for FTP
 IANA FTP Commands and Extensions registry - The official registry of FTP Commands and Extensions
 Raw FTP command list

File Transfer Protocol
FTP commands

es:File Transfer Protocol#Comandos FTP